State Road 372 (NM 372), also known as Snow Road, is a  state highway in Doña Ana, New Mexico, United States, that connects New Mexico State Road 374 (NM 374), south of Mesilla with NM 359 in Mesilla.

Route description

History

Major intersections

See also

 List of state roads in New Mexico

References

External links

372
Transportation in Doña Ana County, New Mexico